Balsaminol may refer to either of two chemical compounds:

 Balsaminol A
 Balsaminol B